The Lake Placid Stakes is a Grade II American Thoroughbred horse race for three-year-old fillies over a distance of one and one-eighths miles on the turf course scheduled annually in late July or early August at Saratoga Race Course in Saratoga Springs, New York. The event currently carries a purse of $200,000.

History 

The event was inaugurated on 20 August 1984 as the Nijana Stakes and was won by the Edward P. Evans owned Possible Mate as part of an entry with Miss Audimar leading throughout the race to win by 2 lengths in a time of 1:50 flat.

The event was named after the broodmare Nijana, who as a two-year-old won the Grade III Schuylerville Stakes in 1975 at Saratoga.

In 1986 the event was upgraded to the Grade III and in 1999 to Grade II.

In 1998 the event was renamed the Lake Placid Stakes after the village of Lake Placid, which is approximately 100 miles north from Saratoga in the Adirondack Mountains.
In 1990 the event was taken off the turf due to the state of the turf track after prolonged inclement weather and was run on dirt. The 2010 event was also moved off the turf, which led to three horses scratched, leaving a field of three.

The Lake Placid was run in two divisions in 1988, 1991, and from 1992 through 1995.

Records
Speed  record:
 miles: 1:46.33 – Tenski (1998)
 miles: 1:40.20 – Jinski's World (1991)

Margins:
 lengths – It's Tea Time (2010)

Most wins by an owner:
 2 – Joan & John Phillips (1996, 2002)
 2 – Ken and Sarah Ramsey (1995, 2012)
 2 – Paul P. Pompa Jr. (2008, 2019)

Most wins by a jockey:
 6 – Jerry D. Bailey (1987, 1993, 1994, 1996, 2000, 2004)

Most wins by a trainer:
 4 – Chad C. Brown (2018, 2019, 2021, 2022)

Winners

Legend:

 
 

Notes:

§ Ran as an entry

† In the 2013 event Nellie Cashman finished first but was disqualified for drifting in the straight and placed third.  	Caroline Thomas was declared the winner.

See also
 List of American and Canadian Graded races

References

Graded stakes races in the United States
Grade 2 stakes races in the United States
Flat horse races for three-year-old fillies
Horse races in New York (state)
Turf races in the United States
Recurring sporting events established in 1984
Saratoga Race Course
1984 establishments in New York (state)